

Pakistan

Palestine

Panama

Papua New Guinea

Paraguay

Peru

Philippines

Poland

Portugal

Puerto Rico

Qatar

Romania

Russia

Rwanda

Réunion

Saudi Arabia

Senegal

Serbia

Sierra Leone

Singapore

Slovakia

Slovenia

Somalia

South Africa

South Sudan

Spain

Sri Lanka

Sudan

Suriname

Sweden

Switzerland

Syria

See also
 World largest cities

References

2014 United Nations Demographic Yearbook (Table 8: Population of capital cities and cities of 100,000 or more inhabitants: latest available year, 1995 - 2014) United Nations Statistics Division, accessed 15 November 2016

Towns and cities with 100,000 or more inhabitants
100,000 or more inhabitants
P